Artūrs Zakreševskis (born 7 August 1971, in Riga) is a former football defender from Latvia and is currently the assistant of Latvia U-15 team. He is currently a member of Latvia national beach soccer team too.

He started his career in Vidus Riga, and has since played for RAF Jelgava, Daugava Riga, FHK Liepājas Metalurgs, FC Skonto and now FK Rīga.

He debuted for the Latvia national team in 1995, and was included in the Euro 2004 squad. He has played 55 international matches and scored one goal.

Career statistics

International goals

References

External links
Latvian Football Federation (in Latvian)

1971 births
Living people
Latvian footballers
Latvia international footballers
UEFA Euro 2004 players
FK Liepājas Metalurgs players
Skonto FC players
FK Rīga players
Footballers from Riga
Latvian football managers
Association football defenders
Latvian people of Belarusian descent